Mohamad Syawal bin Nordin (born 25 March 1993) is Malaysian professional footballer who plays as a centre back for Langkawi City.

Career statistics

Club

Honours

Club
Kedah
Malaysia FA Cup: 2017, 2019
Malaysia Cup: 2016
 Malaysia Charity Shield: 2017

References

External links
 

1993 births
Living people
People from Kedah
Malaysian footballers
Association football defenders
Kedah Darul Aman F.C. players
Malaysia Super League players